Bouquet près de la fenêtre (Bouquet by the Window) is an oil on canvas painting by Marc Chagall dated 1959–1960. , Chagall's biographer (and son-in-law), called it one of Chagall's finest flower paintings.

The lovers in the painting are Chagall and his second wife Valentina Brodsky. His first wife and the great love of his life, Bella Rosenfeld, floats in the upper-left as a ghostly apparition dressed in bridal white. The view in the foreground is of Saint-Paul-de-Vence, near where Chagall settled the last four decades of his life.

The painting fetched £3,218,500 at a Christie's auction in London on 23 June 2015.

See also
List of artworks by Marc Chagall

References

External links 
 Christie's image (zoomable)

1959 paintings
Paintings by Marc Chagall
Birds in art
Flower paintings
Oil on canvas paintings